Night Train Now! is an album by jazz saxophonist Rusty Bryant recorded for the Prestige label in 1969.

Reception

The Allmusic site awarded the album 3½ stars calling it "An effort very much consistent with producer Bob Porter's Prestige "house" soul-jazz sound, utilizing players who would contribute to many other similar efforts in the late '60s and early '70s".

Track listing
All compositions by Rusty Bryant except as noted
 "Cootie Boogaloo" - 5:52  
 "Funky Mama" - 5:50  
 "Funky Rabbits" - 5:35  
 "Night Train" (Jimmy Forrest) - 5:20  
 "With These Hands" - 4:22  
 "Home Fries" - 5:53

Personnel
Rusty Bryant - alto saxophone, tenor saxophone, varitone
Jimmy Carter - organ
Boogaloo Joe Jones - guitar
Eddie Mathias - electric bass
Bernard Purdie - drums

Production
 Bob Porter - producer
 Rudy Van Gelder - engineer

References

Rusty Bryant albums
1969 albums
Prestige Records albums
Albums produced by Bob Porter (record producer)
Albums recorded at Van Gelder Studio